Circling Raven Golf Club is an 18-hole championship golf course in the northwest United States, located in northern Idaho near Worley. It was rated the third best public course in Idaho by Golf Digest in August 2015.

Owned and operated by the Coeur d'Alene Tribe, Circling Raven opened for play  in the summer of 2003. It was preceded on the site by a casino (1993) and hotel (2001). The course is named after a visionary chief of the tribe in the 18th century.

Events
In September 2005, Circling Raven hosted a team from Royal Dornoch Golf Club in Scotland for a friendly international competition and cultural exchange. The following August, the course was the site of the Pacific Northwest PGA Professional Championship, won by Ryan Malby. The event returned six years later in 2012, and was won by Ryan Benzel, a former Idaho Vandal.

Location

Scorecard

References

External links

Visit Idaho – Circling Raven Golf Club
Golf Course Gurus – Circling Raven Golf Course
The Hackers Paradise –          Circling Raven Golf Course Review
Oobgolf: scorecard – Circling Raven Golf Club

Golf clubs and courses in Idaho
Buildings and structures in Kootenai County, Idaho
Tourist attractions in Kootenai County, Idaho
2003 establishments in Idaho
Sports venues completed in 2003